South Staffordshire College is a further education college located over four sites in Staffordshire, England.

The college was created in 2009 as a result of a merger of Cannock Chase Technical College, Rodbaston College and Tamworth and Lichfield College. It now operates over five sites in Lichfield, Rodbaston (Penkridge), Cannock and 2 campuses in Tamworth. The Cannock campus was closed in July 2017 but re-opened as the Skills and Innovation Hub in August 2018.

South Staffordshire College offers a range of further education courses including NVQs, apprenticeships and access courses. The college also has a higher education provision, with courses offered in conjunction with Staffordshire University and the University of Wolverhampton.

The College is a sponsor of The Rural Enterprise Academy, a state-funded secondary school in Penkridge, Staffordshire.

Campuses
 Lichfield Campus, The Friary, Lichfield
 Rodbaston Campus, Penkridge
 Cannock Campus, The Green, Cannock, Staffordshire, 
 Tamworth Campus, Croft Street, Tamworth
 Torc Professional and Technical Centre, Silver Link Road, Glascote Heath, Tamworth

References

External links

 South Staffordshire College homepage

Education in Staffordshire
Cannock
Education in Lichfield
Borough of Stafford
Further education colleges in Staffordshire
Further education colleges in the Collab Group
Educational institutions established in 2009
2009 establishments in England
Education in Tamworth, Staffordshire